Gropius is a German surname. Notable people with the surname include:

 Ati Gropius Johansen (1926–2014), daughter of Walter Gropius and his second wife Ilse
 Karl Wilhelm Gropius, also Carl Wilhelm (1793–1870), German painter and stage set maker
 Manon Gropius (1916–1935), daughter of Walter Gropius and Alma Mahler-Werfel
 Martin Gropius (1824–1880), Historicist architect (uncle of Walter Gropius)
 Walter Gropius (1883–1969), Bauhaus architect

See also
 Gropius House, the house Walter Gropius built for himself and his family in Lincoln, MA, USA
 Gropiusstadt, a planned community designed by Walter Gropius in Berlin-Neukölln, Germany
 Martin-Gropius-Bau, museum and exhibition hall in Berlin, Germany
 Walter-Gropius-Haus (Berlin), a residential building designed by Walter Gropius
 Natural Harmonia Gropius, a character in the Pokémon gaming franchise

German-language surnames